Justina Lavrenovaitė-Perez (née Lavrenovaitė; born 7 October 1984) is a Lithuanian football referee and a former player who played as a midfielder. She has been a member of the Lithuania women's national team.

References

1984 births
Living people
Women's association football midfielders
Women association football referees
Women's association football referees
Lithuanian women's footballers
Lithuania women's international footballers
Lithuanian expatriate footballers
Lithuanian expatriate sportspeople in Belarus
Expatriate women's footballers in Belarus
Lithuanian football referees